Security officials announced over one hundred individuals were apprehended in a series of Saudi arrests of suspected terrorists in March 2010.
The individuals were all reported to be suspected of membership in Al Qaida in the Arabian Peninsula.
Judith Miller, formerly of The New York Times, reporting for Fox News, wrote that the captured men were "exchanging coded e-mails", with Said Ali al-Shihri.

The Telegraph reported that the Saudis arrested 113 individuals.
The suspects included 58 Saudis, 52 Yemenis, one Somali, one Bangla Deshi, and one Ethiopian.
According to The Telegraph the arrests were spread over several months, and were only made public in March.

According to the Australian Broadcasting Corporation the captures represented three separate clandestine cells, which were unaware of one another.
Two of the cells were said to be composed of six individuals each, while the third was said to hold 101 individuals.
The raids were reported to have netted weapons, computers, anonymous prepaid cell phones, documents and cash.
The round-up of the largest cell was reported to have begun with the shootout where al-Shiri's brother-in-law, former Guantanamo captive Yussef Mohammed Mubarak al Shihri was killed.
According to Mansur al-Turki, a Saudi interior ministry spokesman, the cells were targeting Saudi's oil industry.

The Australian Broadcasting Corporation quoted a warning from Clive Williams, an expert in terrorism from Macquarie University, not to underestimate Al Qaida in the Arabian Peninsula.

Williams speculated that Saudi security officials had tortured the survivor of the October shootout.

References

Terrorism in Saudi Arabia
2010 in Saudi Arabia